Chiasmopes is a genus of nursery web spiders that was first described by P. Pavesi in 1883.

Species
 it contains four species, found only in Africa:
Chiasmopes hystrix (Berland, 1922) – Ethiopia
Chiasmopes lineatus (Pocock, 1898) – Central, East, Southern Africa
Chiasmopes namaquensis (Roewer, 1955) – Namibia
Chiasmopes signatus (Pocock, 1902) – South Africa

See also
 List of Pisauridae species

References

Araneomorphae genera
Pisauridae
Spiders of Africa